The Mahajana Eksath Peramuna (People's United Front) was electoral alliance founded in 1956. It consisted of the Sri Lanka Freedom Party led by S. W. R. D. Bandaranaike, Viplavakari Lanka Sama Samaja Party led by Philip Gunawardena and Sinhala Bhasha Peramuna (Sinhala Language Front) led by Wijeyananda Dahanayake and I.M.R.A. Iriyagolla (Independents)

The alliance won the 1956 elections and formed the government.

The MEP alliance fell apart Mr I.M.R.A.  Iriyagolle resigned and joined the opposition, in 1957, May 1959 after Philip Gunawardena and William de Silva resigned from the government. The VLSSP joined the opposition.

The Mahajana Eksath Peramuna name was carried forward by Philip Gunawardena who founded a new political party called Mahajana Eksath Peramuna in 1959.

Electoral history

External links

1956 establishments in Ceylon
1959 disestablishments in Ceylon
Defunct political party alliances in Sri Lanka
Nationalist parties in Sri Lanka
Political parties established in 1956
Political parties disestablished in 1959
Political parties in Sri Lanka
Socialist parties in Sri Lanka